Noel Gunler (born 7 October 2001) is a Swedish professional ice hockey winger currently playing for the Chicago Wolves in the American Hockey League (AHL) as a prospect to the Carolina Hurricanes of the National Hockey League (NHL). Gunler was drafted 41st overall by the Hurricanes in the 2020 NHL Entry Draft.

Playing career
Gunler played as a youth in his native Sweden with hometown club, Luleå HF. He made his Swedish Hockey League (SHL) debut with his Luleå during the 2018–19 season, collected 2 goals and 5 points through 15 games.

During the 2020–21 season, Gunler recorded 3 points through 10 games with Luleå before he transferred to fellow SHL club, Brynäs IF, on 6 November 2020.

In the 2021–22 campaign, his fourth year in the SHL, Gunler showed his offensive potential in finishing second in the team in goals and fourth in points in collecting 13 goals and 23 points in 52 regular season games. After appearing in all 3 post-season games, Gunler left Sweden and was signed to a three-year, entry-level contract with his draft club, the Carolina Hurricanes, on 30 March 2022. With his contract due to begin in the following season, Gunler immediately joined AHL affiliate, the Chicago Wolves, on a professional tryout contract.

Career statistics

Regular season and playoffs

International

Awards and honors

References

External links
 

2001 births
Living people
Brynäs IF players
Carolina Hurricanes draft picks
Chicago Wolves players
Luleå HF players
People from Luleå
Swedish ice hockey forwards
Sportspeople from Norrbotten County